Michael Mario Lewis (born 21 December 1987) is an Israeli actor and fashion model. In summer 2007 and winter 2008 Lewis modeled for the Israeli clothing company Fox, with Esti Ginzburg. He appeared in fashion shows for Castro, and has been on the cover of several Israeli magazines.

In early 2010, he and professional dancer Anna Arronov were winners of the fifth season of Rokdim Im Kokhavim, the Israeli version of Dancing with the Stars.
 
In 2011, Lewis was chosen by E!: Entertainment Television as one of  “The 25 Sexiest men in the world”, next to George Clooney and Brad Pitt.

In 2012 he participated in the sixth season of the Israeli version of the reality show Survivor The VIP season; he retired early in the game due to health problems. He took part in the third season of Italian Peking Express in 2014, along with rally pilot Luca Betti, ending their journey in the fourth episode.

In 2021 he participate again in the new season of the Israeli version of the reality show Survivor The VIP season.

On 14 July 2021 Lewis opened an onlyfans account.

Personal life
Lewis was born and raised in Tel Aviv, Israel, to an Argentine mother and Dutch father. Lewis speaks three languages (Hebrew, English and Italian). He started acting and modeling when he was 15 years old. His hobbies include sports and reading (he often says that "books are my best friends").

References

External links

 

1987 births
Living people
Dancing with the Stars winners
Israeli Jews
Israeli male models
Israeli male television actors
Jewish male models
Israeli people of Argentine-Jewish descent
Israeli people of British-Jewish descent
People from Tel Aviv
Survivor (Israeli TV series) contestants